Steve Buckley (born May 12, 1950) is a former American soccer defender who played one season in the North American Soccer League and two in the American Soccer League.

Buckley attended St. Louis Community College-Florissant Valley, playing on the school's soccer team in 1968 and 1969.  The Flo Valley Fury won the 1969 NJCAA soccer championship.  In 1971, he entered University of Missouri–St. Louis where he was a 1971 and 1972 Second Team All American soccer player.  From 1970 to 1975, Buckley played for the Busch Soccer Club.  In 1977, he signed with the St. Louis Stars of the North American Soccer League.  In 1978 and 1979, he played for the Indianapolis Daredevils of the American Soccer League.

Buckley was inducted into St. Louis Soccer Hall of Fame in 2010.

References

External links
 NASL stats

1950 births
Living people
Association football defenders
American soccer players
American Soccer League (1933–1983) players
Indianapolis Daredevils players
North American Soccer League (1968–1984) players
St. Louis Stars (soccer) players
UMSL Tritons men's soccer players
Sportspeople from Quincy, Illinois